Jet engines and other gas turbine engines are often uprated by adding a zero-stage, sometimes written  '0' stage, to the front of a compressor.
At a given core size, adding a stage to the front of the compressor not only increases the cycle overall pressure ratio, but increases the core mass flow. A further uprating may be done by adding another stage in front of the previously-added zero stage, in which case the new one may be known as a zero-zero stage.

A comparison with other ways of uprating an existing engine without drastically redesigning the engine shows for a particular case, e.g. the Rolls-Royce/SNECMA M45H, the thrust could have been increased by 25% with a zero-staged l-p compressor or 10% with either an improved HP turbine or with water injection.

Zero-staging is also combined with other modifications to provide increased thrust or lower turbine temperature. It may be required for an existing aircraft weight increase, or for a new application, as shown by the following examples.

A 15-stage Rolls-Royce Avon powered the Lightning F.1.  A zero-stage, together with a new turbine, was added (total 16 stages) for the Caravelle III. A zero-zero stage was added (total 17 stages) for the Caravelle VI.

The 7-stage Snecma Atar D was used in the Mystere II. A zero-stage was added (total 8 stages) for the E and G used in the Vautour and Super Mystere B.2.  A zero-zero stage (total 9 stages), together with a 2-stage turbine was added for the Atar 8 and 9 used in the Mirage III.

The Rolls-Royce/Snecma Olympus 593 started with a 6-stage LP compressor. As the Concorde increased in weight during the design phase the take-off thrust requirement increased. The engine was given a zero-stage to the compressor, a redesigned turbine and partial reheat.

Examples of zero-staging for land-based gas turbines are the aeroderivative GE LM2500+ and the heavy-duty GE MS5002B. An alternative to zero-staging used by some OEMs is supercharging the compressor with a fan driven by an electric motor.

Zero-staging is demonstrated by the following relationship:

where:

core mass flow = 

core size =

core total head pressure ratio =  
            
inverse of core total head temperature ratio =  i.e.

core entry total pressure = 

core entry total temperature = 

So basically, increasing  increases .

On the other hand, adding a stage to the rear of the compressor increases overall pressure ratio, and decreases core size, but has no effect on core flow. This option also needs a Turbine with a significantly smaller flow capacity to drive the compressor.

Zero-staging a compressor also implies an increase in shaft speed:

where:

HP Shaft Speed = 

HP Compressor "Non-Dimensional" Speed (based on Exit Total Temperature) = 

HP Compressor Exit Total Temperature = 

So if the "Non-Dimensional" Speed of the original compressor is to be maintained, increasing  increases . This implies an increase in both the blade and disc stress levels.

If the original shaft speed is maintained, then the increase in pressure ratio and mass flow from adding the zero stage will be severely reduced.

Although the above equations are written with zero-staging an HP compressor in mind, the same approach would apply to an LP or IP compressor.

References

Jet engines